The Big Three (hoi megaloi treis) is the nickname of the three most successful sports clubs in Greece, all of whom are located within the Athens urban area. The football teams of AEK, Olympiacos and Panathinaikos have a great rivalry, and are usually the main contenders for the title. Combined they share a total of 79 out of 86 Greek Football Championships ever played and generally they usually end up sharing the top three positions.

Apart from the big three, PAOK has finished most times in the three first places in the league and has won the title three times, being the fourth most successful club in Greece, and the most successful from outside the Greater Athens area. PAOK's recent success have caused the media and the public to start using the term Big Four, with the addition of PAOK in the Big Three.

Aris Thessaloniki and AEL Larissa have also won Greek championships.

See also 
 Big Three (Belgium)
 Big Three (Costa Rica)
 Big Three (Netherlands)
 Big Three (Peru)
 Big Three (Portugal)
 Big Three (Turkey)

References 

Football in Greece
AEK Athens F.C.
Olympiacos F.C.
Panathinaikos F.C.